Tammy Trull is a Latin-American actress.

Early life and career
Trull is of Venezuelan and Cuban descent. She made her professional acting debut in the 2002 action-drama film All Night Bodega, playing the role of Venus Castro, a 15-year-old Nuyorican who finds her performance in school suffering due to her hanging out with the wrong crowd. During the film, Venus experiences parent-child conflicts with her adopted stepmother and she runs away from home and takes up a life on the streets.

Trull's other major film appearances include the 2006 movie Harsh Times, and a cameo in the 2005 film Havoc. She has also appeared in a few minor films such as Target, Bristol Boys, and Next Exit. Tammy Trull has appeared  in several episodes of television sitcoms, including The Brothers Garcia and Invasion. She is also featured in Subway's "No Custom Orders" commercial.

Filmography
 The Afficted (2011) as Grace (Voice) (uncredited)
 Convict (2009) as Penny
 The Ministers (2009) as Liz
 The Life & Times of Tim (2008, TV series, 1 episode) as Hottest Babes On The Planet / Suck It / Philly (voice)
 Invasion (2006, TV series, 4 episodes) as Alma Treadwell
 Vivo (2006, 1 episode) as herself  Amigos Invisibles
 Harsh Times (2005) as Marta
 Havoc (2005) as Young Mother
 Next Exit (2005) as Angie
 Bristol Boys (2005) as Alexis
 Target (2004) as Sunny
 The Brothers Garcia (2003, TV series, 1 episode) as Carmen Santos
 Strong Medicine (2003, TV series, 1 episode) as Lourdes
 All Night Bodega (2002) as Venus Castro
 Pound Puppies (2012, 2013, TV series, 2 episodes) as Sarah / Little Girl #1 (voice)

References

External links

Year of birth missing (living people)
American people of Venezuelan descent
American people of Cuban descent
American film actresses
American television actresses
Hispanic and Latino American actresses
Living people
21st-century American women